The Addington Gardner House is a historic First Period house in Sherborn, Massachusetts.  Its oldest portions dating to about 1730, it is one of the community's oldest surviving buildings, and a good example of transitional First-Second Period style.  The house was listed on the National Register of Historic Places in 1990.

Description and history
The Addington Gardner House stands in a rural residential area of southwestern Sherborn, at the northeast corner of Hollis Street and Western Avenue.  It is a 2-12 story wood-frame structure, with a gabled roof, central chimney, and clapboarded exterior.  The main facade is five bays wide, with a center entrance flanked by pilasters and topped by a corniced entablature.  Windows are simply framed, with the second-floor windows butting against the eave.  A single story ell, added c. 1800 projects from the rear, connecting the house to a later carriage house.  The interior timbers show evidence of 18th-century construction methods consistent with a c. 1730 construction date.  Beams are exposed in the front chambers of the main block, and the left front chamber has a fireplace surround with early Second Period carving.

The oldest portions of this house (possibly just the front rooms) were built c. 1730 by Addington Gardner.  The house is a classic five-bay -story timber-frame structure, with a large central chimney.  The house remained in the Gardner family until 1911, when it was sold to a local farmer and politician.

See also
National Register of Historic Places listings in Sherborn, Massachusetts

References

Houses on the National Register of Historic Places in Middlesex County, Massachusetts
Houses in Sherborn, Massachusetts
Houses completed in 1730